M. E. Holland (born in 1967) is an American writer, director, producer, and actor.  He owns a production company, DelFlix Pictures. He wrote and directed his first film The Other Brother (2001).  In 2007, he wrote the screenplay for Love and Other Four Letter Words.   Holland's work covers controversial issues such as sexual abuse, toxic masculinity, American misogyny, and morality in the African American community.

Early life and education
Holland was born January 17, 1967, in Manhattan, New York.  His mother, Margaret, was a homemaker, and his father, Nick, owned two stores in Harlem.  Around the age of 12, his parents moved the family to Mount Vernon, New York for two years and then to Greenburgh, New York in Westchester County where he graduated from Greenburgh High School.

Career
In 1986, Holland joined the U. S. Army where he received seven service medals and commendations.  After being honorably discharged in October 1988, he returned to New York to complete his undergraduate education at Fordham University.

After receiving his B.A. in U.S. History and Minor in African-American Studies in 1992, he started taking non-matriculated courses at The New School in Manhattan and then was accepted at the  New York University Tisch School of the Arts, from which he graduated from their film program.  Holland won an award from the Writer's Network for a screenplay entitled A Gentleman's Game.  He made his first independent feature film prior to graduating by borrowing money from his parents and Gu-Art film lab.  He began working as a production assistant intern on Spike Lee's set of Clockers where he met Mekhi Phifer; it was both of their first experiences working in the film industry.

Holland's debut film, The Other Brother, starring Mekhi Phifer, was showcased at the Urbanworld Film Festival and the Sedona International Film Festival.  The film was picked up by Xenon Pictures and played in movie theatres across the United States. It was reviewed by Kevin Thmomas in the Los Angeles Times  and by Dave Kehr in the New York Times

Filmography

Films

Music videos

Podcasts

Books

References

External links
  
 M. E. Holland Official Website

1967 births
Living people
African-American film directors
African-American film producers
African-American screenwriters
Fordham University alumni
People from Greenburgh, New York
Writers from Manhattan
People from Mount Vernon, New York
Tisch School of the Arts alumni
United States Army soldiers